Sierra Leone Ministry of Education is a Ministerial department of the Government of Sierra Leone that is in charge of planning, overseeing, and implementing the educational policies of Sierra Leone . The Ministry of Education advises the President of Sierra Leone and the Government of Sierra Leone on issues related to Education. The Ministry has its headquarters in the capital Freetown .

The Sierra Leone Ministry of Education is headed by the Minister of Education. The current Sierra Leone Minister of Education is David Moinina Sengeh, .

Roles and responsibilities
The Sierra Leone Ministry of Education responsibilities include:
 Implementing the Sierra Leone Education System
 Overseeing the Sierra Leone Education System
 Planning the Sierra Leone Education System
 Set up policies and regulations for the Sierra Leone Education System
 Handles the Sierra Leone Education Ministry budget
 Manages all government Universities and government colleges in Sierra Leone
 Manages all government schools in Sierra Leone  (including government primary schools, government junior secondary schools, government secondary schools and government schools for the disables
 Ensure accurate, proper and timely monthly payment of all government employees in the Sierra Leone Education System (including monthly payment of principals,  teachers, professors and school administrators
 Investigate fraud in the Sierra Leone Education System
 Set up policies and regulations of all private schools in Sierra Leone (including private universities)
 Ensure all government schools and private schools follow the planning and regulation of the Sierra Leone Education System
 Ensure every child who has got to the minimum school age, attends school
 Prioritise to drop the illiteracy rate in Sierra Leone
 Prioritise to increase the literacy rate in Sierra Leone
 Gives out academic scholarship to certain students who have met the requirements, to study within Sierra Leone or outside of Sierra Leone
 Responsible for the safety and security of all students in Sierra Leone government schools
 Keeps record of all current and former students in the Sierra Leone Public Schools
 Manages government schools feeding program
 Manages  government schools physical health program
 Manages government schools broadcasting
 Manages government schools official sporting competition, journalism and other official Extracurricular activities

Organisations
The Sierra Leone Ministry of Education is headed by the Minister of Education, who is the overall head of the Sierra Leone Ministry of Education. The current Minister of Education is David Moinina Sengeh. Below the Minister of Education and Deputy Minister of Education is the chief education officer. Each One of Sierra Leone's fourteen District is headed by a deputy director who reports to and works under the supervision of the Sierra Leone Minister of Education and the two deputy ministers of Education, and the chief education officer .

External links
 http://www.mbsse.gov.sl/

Government departments of Sierra Leone
Education in Sierra Leone